The Malaysia national baseball team is the national baseball team of Malaysia. The team represents Malaysia in international competitions.

Placings
Southeast Asian Games
 2007 : 5th

National baseball teams in Asia
Baseball in Malaysia
Baseball